Luis Sosa (born 15 October 1949) is a Uruguayan former cyclist. He competed in the team time trial at the 1968 Summer Olympics.

References

External links
 

1949 births
Living people
Uruguayan male cyclists
Olympic cyclists of Uruguay
Cyclists at the 1968 Summer Olympics
Sportspeople from Montevideo